Odisseia is a Portuguese comedy television series.  It premiered January 20, 2013, on RTP1.

Concept
The series has two different plots. In the main storyline, the series follows a fictionalized version of Bruno and Gonçalo on a journey through Portugal. The second plot is the writers plot. In this one, Bruno and Gonçalo, as writers, discuss with the producer and the director about the scenes they are writing.

Cast

Main cast
 Bruno Nogueira as Himself
 Gonçalo Waddington as Himself
 Tiago Guedes as Himself
 Tiago Rodrigues as Himself

Guest
 Nuno Lopes as Himself
 Rita Blanco as Herself
 Miguel Borges as Oráculo

Episodes

Broadcast history

Portuguese-language television shows
Portuguese comedy television series

2013 Portuguese television series debuts